is a railway station on the Fujikyuko Line in the city of Tsuru, Yamanashi, Japan, operated by Fuji Kyuko (Fujikyu).

Lines

Station layout

The station is staffed and consists of two staggered side platforms serving two tracks, with the station building located on the south (down) side of the tracks. Passengers cross the tracks between the platforms via a level crossing. It has waiting rooms and toilet facilities.

Platforms

Adjacent stations

History
Higashikatsura Station opened on 19 June 1929.

Passenger statistics
In fiscal 1998, the station was used by an average of 759 passengers daily.

Surrounding area
 Shishidome Power Station
 Sun Park Tsuru grass ski slope
 Chūō Expressway

See also
 List of railway stations in Japan

References

External links

 Fujikyuko station information 

Railway stations in Yamanashi Prefecture
Railway stations in Japan opened in 1929
Stations of Fuji Kyuko
Tsuru, Yamanashi